San Juan, officially the Municipality of San Juan,  is a 1st class municipality in the province of Batangas, Philippines. According to the 2020 census, it has a population of 114,068 people.

The town is known for its baroque church and the Pinagbayanan excavation, the most important archaeological site in the municipality.

History
In the years 1698 until 1836, San Juan was just a barrio of the large town of Rosario located in the eastern part of Batangas. From 1837, the government of San Juan was governed by tinientes or Deputies with term of one to two years. However, when San Juan was recognized as a separate town in 1843, the position of tinientes was replaced by Cabezas de Barangay serving one for each new barrio. It was only in 1848 when the Spanish government officially recognized the independence of San Juan from its mother town of Rosario, and was given the name San Juan de Bocboc.

San Juan was headed by a Gobernadorcillo in 1864. The first Goberdanorcillo was Don Camilo Perez, a prominent citizen who initiated the separation of San Juan from Rosario. He is considered as the founder of the town, and was honored for his contribution in public works and peace and order in the newly created town.

On October 28, 1883, San Juan experienced a major disaster due to continuous winds and intense storm rain. Huge flood from the Bancoro and Bangbang Rivers hit the town resulting to the destruction of houses, drowning of livestocks and planted crops, and the devastation of the church and its convent. In 1886, the flooding become worse in the town. The parish priest had to erect a temporary church and convent in a site seven kilometers away from the town.

On January 18, 1886, the officials of the town initiated the transfer of the new town to Calitcalit. The transfer of the Lumang Bayan to its present location was approved by Governor General Valeriano Weyler on December 12, 1890, during the administration of Gobernadorcillo Benedicto De Villa. San Juan de Bocboc was renamed to Bolbok by virtue of Act No. 2390 dated February 28, 1914. In the early years of 1920, Bolbok was then renamed as San Juan, in honor of San Juan Nepomuceno, the town's patron saint.

On April 4, 1945, the town was liberated from Japanese occupation by the F Company, 188th Infantry of the United States Army as part of their clearing operations to liberate the Bicol peninsula from the hands of the Japanese.

Geography
North of San Juan is the neighboring town of Candelaria, with Malaking Ilog River defining its geographical boundary. Tayabas Bay lies east and the hills on the eastern portion separate it from the towns of Lobo and Rosario.

According to the Philippine Statistics Authority, the municipality has a land area of  constituting  of the  total area of Batangas.

Barangays

San Juan is politically subdivided into 42 barangays.

Climate

Demographics

In the 2020 census, San Juan had a population of 114,068.

Economy 

San Juan is a first class municipality in the province of Batangas. It is initially identified as one of the Special Economic Zones ( ECOZONES). According to RA 7916 or the Special Economic Zone Act of 1995, ecozones are selected areas with highly developed or which have the potential to be developed into agro-industrial, industrial, tourist/recreational, commercial, banking, investment and financial centers.

San Juan is a tourist destination known for its white-sand beaches. The tourism and aquaculture industries provide jobs to the town's people and income to the town economy.

Because of its fertile land, the municipality is one of the top suppliers of agricultural products in the province.

The town has also a coconut wine and pottery industry.

Income
Here's the list of the total annual income, assets, expenses and equity of San Juan since 2015, according to the Annual Audit Reports of the Commission on Audit:

Government

Government officials

The 2022 local elections in San Juan was held on May 9, 2022. Five municipal councilors, elected on May 13, 2019, were re-elected while the three others will serve their first term. The following are the elected government officials of San Juan. Their term will expire on June 30, 2025.

List of former Municipal Mayors

Official seal

 Horse – The municipality is known for its horses and other farm animals like cows, pigs, and goats.
 Tuba Container – locally known as batang, a container in which tuba is gathered from the coconut tree. 
 Fruits – Fruits such as mangoes, citrus, atis and tamarind which are grown abundantly in the town.
 Roundels – signifies the number of barangays (42) comprising the municipality

Tourism

On June 29, 2010, then President Gloria Macapagal Arroyo signed the Executive Order No. 904, series of 2010 designating the Municipality of San Juan, Batangas as a priority area for Tourism Development.

Attractions include:
 San Juan Nepomuceno Church – The church was built during the Spanish colonial period.
 Laiya Beach – San Juan has a coastline with several beach resorts for swimming, diving and other outdoor activities
 Mangrove Forest at Barangay Poctol – One of the largest mangrove areas in San Juan; located in Sitio Pontor
 Ancestral houses – Built during Spanish and American colonial periods in the town.
 Municipal Hall – Erected on 1928 under the administration of Juan R. Quizon, the then Presidente Municipal. It has a simple yet enticing architectural style
 Malaking River at Barangay Poctol – This river serves as a boundary between Batangas and Quezon Province.
 Naambon Falls - A secluded, undisturbed series of falls and small pools. It has several look-out points with views of dense forest and Tayabas Bay.

Education
Private schools in town include Joseph Marello Institute, Batangas Eastern Colleges, CCFI Christian Academy, South Ridge Asian Integrated Montessori School, and San Juan Institute of Technology founded in 1947, 1940, 1991, 2011, and 2018 respectively. San Juan has also a campus of Batangas State University located at Barangay Talahiban II.

Almost all barangays have their own elementary and high schools, where tuition fees are relatively low.

Despite improvements of the town's education system, parents of some students from well-off families send their children to Metro Manila for college.

Notable personalities

 Renato de Villa – Former Chief of Staff, Armed Forces of the Philippines; Former Secretary, Department of National Defense; 1998 Presidential Election Candidate
 Rudy Salud – Founding Secretary General, World Boxing Council; Former PBA Commissioner; Boxing Manager and Promoter
 Leandro Mendoza – Former Executive Secretary under President Gloria Macapagal Arroyo; Former Police Director General, Philippine National Police (2001)
 Salvador Q. Quizon – Auxiliary Bishop-Emeritus, Archdiocese of Lipa
 Alyssa Valdez – Volleyball player, Ateneo Lady Eagles
 Meynardo A. Sabili – former Mayor of Lipa City

References

External links
 
 [ Philippine Standard Geographic Code]

Municipalities of Batangas
Beaches of the Philippines